Bet Avraam Synagogue is a synagogue located behind the main train station in Sirkeci in Istanbul, Turkey. It is the synagogue nearest to the Sultanahmet (Hippodrome) area and can be reached easily by foot.  It conducts Shabbat services.

See also
 History of the Jews in Turkey
 List of synagogues in Turkey

References and notes

External links
 Chief Rabbinate of Turkey
 Shalom Newspaper - The main Jewish newspaper in Turkey

Synagogues in Istanbul
Fatih